Yuri Vladimirovich Nesterenko (born May 18, 1956) is a Russian professional football coach and a former player. In 2010, he managed FC Taganrog.

External links
 Career summary by KLISF

1956 births
Living people
Footballers from Kharkiv
Soviet footballers
FC Metalist Kharkiv players
FC Zvezda Perm players
Russian football managers
FC Zhemchuzhina Sochi managers
FC Tobol Kurgan managers
FC Kuzbass Kemerovo managers
Association football defenders